The posterior superior alveolar nerves (or posterior superior dental nerves or posterior superior alveolar branches) arise from the trunk of the maxillary nerve just before it enters the infraorbital groove; they are generally two in number, but sometimes arise by a single trunk.

They descend on the tuberosity of the maxilla and give off several twigs to the gums and neighboring parts of the mucous membrane of the cheek.

They then enter the alveolar canals on the infratemporal surface of the maxilla, and, passing from behind forward in the substance of the bone, communicate with the middle superior alveolar nerve, and give off branches to the lining membrane of the maxillary sinus and gingival and dental branches to each molar tooth from a superior dental plexus; these branches enter the apical foramina at the roots of the teeth.

The posterior superior alveolar nerve innervates the second and third maxillary molars, and two of the three roots of the maxillary first molar (all but the mesiobuccal root).  When giving a posterior superior alveolar nerve block, it will anesthetize the mesialbuccal root of the maxillary first molar approximately 72% of the time.

See also 
 Alveolar nerve (Dental nerve)
 Superior alveolar nerve (Superior dental nerve)
 Anterior superior alveolar nerve (Anterior superior dental nerve)
 Middle superior alveolar nerve (Middle superior dental nerve)
 Inferior alveolar nerve (Inferior dental nerve)

Additional images

References

External links
 
 
 

Maxillary nerve